Bandar Tasik Puteri (est. population 70,000) is a township area near Batu Arang, Selangor, Malaysia.

Demographics
As of 2013 it is estimated that there are 60,000 people residing in Bandar Tasik Puteri. The primary residents appear to be Malay followed by Chinese and Indian. The area is surrounded by neighbouring Kampung Bahru Kundang village, M-Residence & M-Residence 2 (Mah Sing Group), Kundang Estates (Gamuda Land) and Bandar Baru Kundang.

Geography
It is divided into 34 sections ranging from BTP1 to BTP34. This township consists of apartments, terrace houses, semi-detached houses and super link bungalows. These sections are served by roads, e.g. Jalan 4/22 ("Jalan" is a Malay word that means road, 4 is the section and 22 is the road number.) Houses on one side of the road have even numbers, and the other side have odd numbers. Hence, one side of a road will consist of houses with numbers 2, 4, 6, 8 and so on while the opposite will have houses numbered 1, 3, 5, 7 and so forth.

Accessibility

Car
Bandar Tasik Puteri has road networks with accessibility via New Klang Valley Expressway , North–South Expressway Northern Route , Kuala Lumpur–Kuala Selangor Expressway , Guthrie Corridor Expressway and Kuala Lumpur–Rawang Highway Federal Route 1 as well a shortcut through the road from Rawang–Bestari Jaya Road .

A new Bandar Tasik Puteri Interchange (Exit 2504) from Kuala Lumpur–Kuala Selangor Expressway is constructed to allow easier access into the Kuala Lumpur City Centre, and to decrease the traffic congestion in Jalan Batu Arang.

Public transportation
MARA Liner bus BET5 connects Bandar Tasik Puteri to the city centre and bus MPS3 to KTM / MRT Sungai Buloh.

Amenities

Place of Worship
 Tokong Guan Di (關帝廟)

Education
There are two national primary schools and a Chinese primary school (planning). There is only one secondary schools in Bandar Tasik Puteri.

There is also Victoria International College, which is a private tertiary institution approved and recognized by the Ministry of higher education and MQA.

For early childhood development centre or kindergarten, there are plenty of centres available, such as Smart Reader Kids, Brainy Bunch Islamic Montessori and a well known Waldorf Education school, Waldorf Kelip-Kelip.

Leisure 
Bandar Tasik Puteri has Tasik Puteri Golf and Country Club. It is a 27-hole Golf course with clubhouse facility,. Beside that, there is also Golfview Residence Club for Bandar Tasik Puteri residents and the surrounding residential areas that provides facilities such as swimming pool, steam room, gym, meetings and conferences facilities, a ballroom, a cafe Restaurant. There are ample parking facilities available for members and guests. Both property are being managed by Federal Hotels Internationals (FHI).

A  Puteri Central Park, Puteri Recreational Park and a bird sanctuary are among the leisure areas for the community of Bandar Tasik Puteri .

Administration
Bandar Tasik Puteri falls under the jurisdiction of the Selayang Municipal Council and Mukim Rawang. It too falls under the parliamentary constituency of Selayang, and thus is represented in parliament by William Leong Jee Keen from Pakatan Harapan-Parti Keadilan Rakyat.

Notes and references

External links
Bandar Tasik Puteri Official Website

Populated places established in 1998
1998 establishments in Malaysia
Gombak District
Townships in Selangor